NBA Nation is a touring property operated by the National Basketball Association through its subsidiary, NBA Entertainment. The tour appears alongside local events across the United States during the spring and summer and features a variety of NBA-themed events and programs, such as skills contests and fitness clinics. The tour also addresses social issues in the host cities as part of the league's outreach program.

History
In 2001, the NBA launched NBA Rhythm ’n Rims as a traveling basketball and music event in partnership with Yahoo!. On the road for six years, NBA Rhythm ’n Rims featured musical performances by popular recording artists, including Cee-Lo Green in 2002, MC Lyte in 2003 and Nappy Roots in 2004. During its time on the road, NBA and WNBA players and NBA Legends made appearances. The event was re-launched as NBA Nation in 2007.

The tour's itinerary changes each year. According to the NBA's Director of Events and Attractions, Karen Barberan, "Routing the NBA Nation tour year after year is a challenge, as we are constantly balancing efforts to hit well-attended events and festivals in key NBA markets, while satisfying the marketing targets of our tour [brand] partners." In a given year, over one million people across the U.S. will visit one of the tour stops.

Events
NBA Nation features a competitive skills challenge similar to the events seen during NBA's All-Star Saturday Night, such as slam dunk contests and agility courses, with prizes awarded to the winners. Visitors can also attend basketball and fitness clinics and meet past and present NBA players. The clinics are hosted by NBA Ambassador and Legend, Darryl Dawkins, as part of the league's community outreach program, NBA Cares.

The event site includes a  attraction venue, which is transported as a custom-built  tractor-trailer. When converted at the site, the facility houses interactive activities and various exhibits.

2010 schedule
NBA Nation's 2010 tour was launched in Phoenix, Arizona with stops in Denver, Los Angeles, Cleveland, New York City, Philadelphia, Minnesota, and Dallas. Each event on the tour features talent and special appearances by local NBA players and legends, mascots, dance teams, radio deejays, and performers. Throughout the tour, NBA Legend Darryl Dawkins serves as the official "NBA Nation Ambassador," joined by official host and emcee Mike Garcia (Emcee Mike) and co-host Jaclyn (Emcee Jac).  Partners for the NBA Nation 2010 tour include T-Mobile USA, Kia Motors, and Sprite.

The tour itinerary for the 2010 season includes:

2011 schedule
NBA Nation's 2010 tour tips off in Houston, Texas with stops in Denver, Los Angeles, Atlanta, Miami, San Antonio, New York City, and Washington, DC. Each event on the tour features talent and special appearances by local NBA Players and Legends, mascots, dance teams, radio DJ’s, and performers. Throughout the tour, NBA Legend Darryl Dawkins serves as the official “NBA Nation Ambassador” joined by official host and emcee Mike Garcia (MC Mike). NBA Legend A.C. Green to appear at the L.A. stop.

Partners for the NBA Nation 2011 tour include T-Mobile USA, Kia Motors, and Sprite, and Dribble to Stop Diabetes.

The tour itinerary for the 2011 season includes:

References

External links
 Official website
 NBA Nation on Twitter
 NBA Nation on Facebook

National Basketball Association